Mariam Hakobyan (born 1949, Yerevan) is an Armenian sculptor based in Armenia.

Education and career

Hakobyan graduated from the Yerevan State Institute of Fine Arts in 1974, and completed her undergraduate work at the Panos Terlemezian Fine Arts College in 1968. She has been a member of the Artists' Union of Armenia since 1979, and served as a secretary of the Sculpture Section for many years. She is the founder of “NorEon” Creative Center which promotes the Armenian visual arts throughout the world and assists Armenian artists in their professional careers.

Hakobyan was a member of the faculty at the Roslyn Fine Arts Institute  from 1993 to 1997, and devoted many years to working with the youth at the Children's Center for Aesthetic Education and Schoolchildren's Recreation Center in Yerevan (1976–1990).

During her career, Hakobyan has participated in numerous exhibitions, sculpture symposia, festivals, and biennales both in Armenia and abroad. Her minor sculptures and graphics are held in many state and private galleries and museums, while monumental sculptures can be found throughout the world. 

She received many awards and prizes including the International Mon-Art Prize of Florence (Italy, 1998), Third Prize at the International Festival of Ice Sculpture (Russia, 2004), Second Prize at the competition “Stone-Monument” (China, 2001), Third Prize at the International Sculpture Symposium (Lithuania, 2003), Bronze medal at the 12th International Biennale dedicated to Dante's "Divine Comedy" (Italy, 1996). 

Her monument "Faith", dedicated to the 1700th anniversary of the adoption of Christianity as a state religion in Armenia was commissioned by the Armenian community of Vienna and now stands at the Armenian square adjacent to Vienna's Armenian Apostolic Church.

Exhibitions

Hakobyan participated in hundreds of exhibitions over her career, including:
 2010 Exhibition dedicated to the 95th anniversary of the Armenian Genocide, Yerevan, Armenia
 2005 56th Annual Artists’ Ball, Armenian Students’ Association, New York, NY
 2003 Republican Exhibition of Graphics, Yerevan, Armenia
 2003 Republican Exhibition “Sculpture 2003”, Yerevan, Armenia
 1999-2003 Moscow International Art Salon, Central House of Artists, Moscow, Russia
 2002 Exhibition dedicated to the 70th anniversary of Artists’ Union of Armenia, Yerevan, Armenia
 2000-2001 Manege Art Salon, Moscow, Russia
 2001 "Artists from Armenia", Samara, Russia
 2001 Exhibition dedicated to the 1700th anniversary of the adoption of Christianity as a state religion in Armenia, Yerevan, Armenia
 2001 Tour Exhibition "Dante in Armenia: Friendship bridges", Yerevan, Armenia, Ravenna, Italy
 2000 “Art Manege 2000” International Art Fair, Moscow, Russia
 1999 Goldsmith ’99 2nd International exhibition-sale, Yerevan, Armenia
 1998 Exhibition dedicated to the Armenian Army, Yerevan, Armenia
 1990-1998 9-13th International Biennales dedicated to Dante’s "Divine Comedy", Ravenna, Italy
 1997 Festival "Women creators of the two Seas - the Mediterranean and the Black Sea", Thessaloniki, Greece
 1994 Sculpture and Graphics, Yerevan, Armenia
 1993 Artists from Armenia, Boston, MA
 1991 International tour exhibition, Russia, Norway, Germany
 1989 7th International Biennale of minor sculpture, Poznan, Poland
 1988 Quadriennale of Sculpture, Riga, Latvia
 1978-2004 Annual exhibitions of the Artists’ Union of Armenia, Yerevan, Armenia
 1975, 1977, 1987 – Union-Wide exhibitions, Moscow, Russia

Solo exhibitions
 2011 Galerie Gavart, Paris, France
 2010 "Sculpture and Painting", Museum of National Architecture and Urban Life of Gyumri, Armenia
 2009 "Sculpture, Painting and Graphics", Artists’ Union of Armenia, Yerevan, Armenia
 2006 "Fire of Time. Painting and Sculpture," Orchard Gallery, Bethesda, MD, USA
 2005 Exhibition-presentation "Sculpture, Painting and Graphics", Embassy of Armenia, Washington, DC
 2004 "Monumental Art and Bronze Minor Sculpture," Albert and Tove Boyajian Gallery, Yerevan State Academy of Fine Arts, Yerevan, Armenia
 1999 Artists’ Union of Armenia, Yerevan, Armenia
 1997 House of Chamber Music, Yerevan, Armenia
 1997 Museum of Yervand Kochar, Yerevan, Armenia
 1996 Exhibition at the 32nd International Chess Olympiad, Yerevan, Armenia

External links

Mariam Hakobyan - AbsoluteArts.com
Mariam Hakobyan - Sculpture (catalog of works in Armenian, English and Russian)
ASPIRATION AS A SEARCH FOR WILL, by Rouben Angaladian
 Հայուհու քանդակները զարդարում են աշխարհը
 Մարիամ Հակոբյանի քանդակները՝ փարիզյան «Գավարտ» ցուցասրահում
 Mariam Hakobyan - myART
 Mariam Hakobyan - Galerie Gavart
 Mariam Hakobyan - Stone Sculpture Park of Vidmantas Martikonis "Vilnoja"

Armenian sculptors
1949 births
Living people
Artists from Yerevan
20th-century Armenian women artists
21st-century Armenian women artists